Stella Maris is a resort town in Long Island, the Bahamas. It was established during 1963. Stella Maris has a year-round population estimated at 80 people.

Transportation
The town is served by Stella Maris Airport, with services on Southern Air Charter to Nassau and Deadman's Cay, Bahamas.

External links

1963 establishments in the Bahamas
Populated places in the Bahamas